The M2 Bradley, or Bradley IFV, is an American infantry fighting vehicle that is a member of the Bradley Fighting Vehicle family. It is manufactured by BAE Systems Land & Armaments, which was formerly United Defense.

The Bradley is designed for reconnaissance and to transport a squad of infantry, providing them protection from small arms fire, while providing firepower to both suppress and eliminate most threats to friendly infantry. It is designed to be highly maneuverable and to be fast enough to keep up with heavy armor during an advance. The M2 holds a crew of three: a commander, a gunner, and a driver, as well as six fully equipped soldiers as passengers.

In the year 2000 the total cost of the program was $5,664,100,000 for 1,602 units, giving an average unit cost of $3,166,000, or $5,500,000 per in 2022.

Design 
The Bradley IFV was developed largely in response to the amphibious Soviet BMP family of infantry fighting vehicles, and to serve as both an armored personnel carrier (APC), and a tank-killer. Design began in 1963 and entered production in 1981. One specific design requirement was that it should be as fast as the new M1 Abrams main battle tank so that they could maintain formations while moving, something which the older M113 armored personnel carrier could not do, as it had been designed to complement the older M60 Patton.

Armament 

The Bradley is equipped with the M242 25 mm autocannon as its main weapon. The M242 has a single barrel with an integrated dual-feed mechanism and remote feed selection. The gun has 300 ready rounds in two ready boxes, one of 70 rounds – usually AP-type rounds, the other of 230 rounds – usually HE-type rounds, with another 600 rounds in storage. The two ready boxes allow a selectable mix of rounds, such as the M791 APDS-T (Armor-Piercing Discarding Sabot (with) Tracer), and M792 HEI-T (High Explosive Incendiary (with) Tracer) rounds. The 25 mm automatic gun is primarily used for clearing bunkers and firing on lightly armored vehicles.

While the 25 mm automatic gun is not the weapon of choice for engaging tanks, vehicle commanders, crews, and CALL and Army Infantry Center personnel reported isolated instances in which the 25 mm automatic gun had killed tanks. However, Army Materiel Systems Analysis Activity (AMSAA) officials stated that, on the basis of their assessment of combat vehicles in the Persian Gulf war, for the 25 mm automatic gun to kill a tank, the tank would have to be hit at close range in its more vulnerable areas. 

Subsequent ammunition developments resulted in the M919 APFSDS-T (Armor-Piercing Fin Stabilized Discarding Sabot with Tracer) round, which contains a finned depleted-uranium penetrator similar in concept to armor-piercing munitions used in modern tanks. The M919 was used in combat during the 2003 invasion of Iraq.

It is also armed with an M240C machine gun mounted coaxially to the M242, with 2,200 rounds of 7.62 mm ammunition. For engaging heavier targets, such as when acting in an anti-tank fashion, the Bradley has a TOW missile system on board. It was changed from the M2A1 model to fire TOW II missiles. M2 infantry Bradleys have firing ports for a number of M231 Firing Port Weapons or FPWs, providing a button-up firing position to replace the top-side gunners on the old ACAV, though the M231 is rarely employed. Initial variants carried six, but the side ports were plated over with the new armor used on the A2 and A3 variants, leaving only the two rear-facing mounts in the loading ramp.

Countermeasures 
The use of aluminum armor and the storage of large quantities of ammunition in the vehicle initially raised questions about its combat survivability. Spaced laminate belts and high hardness steel skirts have been added to later versions to improve armor protection. This has increased overall weight to 33 tons. However, actual combat operations have not shown the Bradley to be deficient as losses have been few. In friendly fire incidents in Desert Storm, many crew members survived hits that resulted in total losses for lighter USMC LAV-25 vehicles.

All versions are equipped with two four-barreled smoke grenade launchers on the front of the turret for creating defensive smoke screens, which can be loaded with chaff and flares.

In December 2018, the Army announced it would be installing an Israeli made active protection system the Iron Fist, on M2 Bradleys of one armored brigade as a near-term solution to enhance protection against anti-tank rockets and missiles. However, the original configuration proved too ineffective and delayed the installment. Testing in 2022 of a reconfigured version called the Iron Fist Light Decoupled were more successful, and the Army intends to field a brigade set in 2025.

Chassis 
The Bradley has a welded aluminum unit or monocoque structure to which the armor is attached, mostly on the outside. The suspension is by torsion bars and cranks. Six small rubber rimmed, divided road wheels on each side straddle the location flanges sticking up from the tread. These were originally of aluminum, but were changed to steel as vehicle weight increased. The steel treads sit on flat hard rubber tires.

Mobility 
The Bradley is highly capable in cross-country open terrain, in accordance with one of the main design objectives of keeping pace with the M1 Abrams main battle tank. Whereas the M113 would float without much preparation, the Bradley was initially designed to float by deploying a flotation curtain around the vehicle. This caused some drownings due to failures during its first trials. Armor upgrades have negated this capability.

History

Production history 

The M2, which was named after World War II General Omar Bradley, carries a crew of three and a six-man dismountable infantry squad.

The vehicle entered service with the U.S. Army in 1981, and 4,641 M2 variants have been produced since.

Even after the troubled development history of the Bradley, additional problems occurred after production started, as later detailed by Air Force Colonel James G. Burton, who took part in the design and fielding process. Burton advocated the use of comprehensive live fire tests against fully loaded military vehicles to check for survivability. The Army and Navy agreed and established the Joint Live Fire testing program in 1984. When testing the Bradley, disagreements occurred between Burton and the Ballistic Research Laboratory (BRL) at Aberdeen Proving Grounds, which preferred smaller, more controlled, "building block" tests that could be used to improve the databases used to model vehicle survivability, as opposed to full up tests with random shots, which reduce the possibility of bias but produced little useful statistical data. 

Burton insisted on a series of “overmatch" tests in which weapon systems would be fired at the Bradley that were known to be able to easily penetrate its armor. Burton saw attempts to avoid such tests as dishonest, while the BRL saw them as wasteful as they already knew the vehicle would fail. The disagreements became so contentious that a Congressional inquiry was set up. As a result of the tests, additional improvements to vehicle survivability were added.

As of May 2000, 4,641 M2s had been produced for the U.S. Army.

Saudi Arabia stated an interest in acquiring the Bradley in 1989 and began importing the vehicle in 1990. Bradley production concluded in 1995. A total of 6,785 M2/M3 Bradleys were produced, including 400 for Saudi Arabia.

Combat history 

During the Persian Gulf War, M2 Bradleys destroyed more Iraqi armored vehicles than the M1 Abrams. Twenty Bradleys were lost—three by enemy fire and 17 due to friendly fire incidents. Another 12 were damaged. The gunner of one Bradley was killed when his vehicle was hit by Iraqi fire, possibly from an Iraqi BMP-1, during the Battle of 73 Easting. To remedy some problems that were identified as contributing factors in the friendly fire incidents, infrared identification panels and other marking/identification measures were added to the Bradleys.

In the Iraq War, the Bradley proved somewhat vulnerable to improvised explosive device (IED) and rocket-propelled grenade (RPG) attacks, but casualties were light—the doctrine being to allow the crew to escape at the expense of the vehicle. As of early 2006, total combat losses included between 55 and 100 Bradleys. By the end of the war, about 150 Bradleys had been destroyed.

The M2A3 variant began to replace the M3A3 cavalry fighting vehicles in US Army armored reconnaissance units in 2014, as the increased ammunition of the loads carried by the M3A3s reduced the number of scouts able to be dismounted. In 2016, a reorganisation of reconnaissance unit structures and compositions saw large-scale replacements of Humvees within these units with M2A3s, increasing the tactical mobility and maneuver warfare capabilities of US Army armored reconnaissance brigades.

On 4 January 2023, President Joe Biden was asked by a journalist during a press event if M2 Bradleys were "on the table" for Ukraine. His response was "Yes", without further explanation. This follows France's promise to send AMX-10 RC and ACMAT Bastion. The next day, the Pentagon confirmed 50 Bradleys were included as part of a $3 billion package as part of assistance to Ukraine during the 2022 Russian invasion of Ukraine; Germany also committed to sending the Marder (IFV). The decision to send the Bradley was made because by that point the U.S. had determined Ukrainian forces had demonstrated they were proficient in maintenance and sustainment of such Western-made AFVs. Another 59 vehicles were included in another package later that month.

Replacement 

U.S. Army efforts to replace the Bradley began in the mid-1980s under the Armored Systems Modernization program. The Army studied creating several vehicle variants under a common heavy chassis to replace main battle tanks and Bradleys. This effort was canceled in 1992 due to the collapse of the Soviet Union.

The U.S. Army began the Future Combat Systems (FCS) Manned Ground Vehicles program in 1999. This family of 18-ton lightweight tracked vehicles centered around a common chassis. It would consist of eight variants, including infantry carriers, scouting vehicles and main battle tanks. FCS was canceled in 2009 due to budget cuts.

In 2010, the Army began the Ground Combat Vehicle program to replace the M2 Bradley. Entries from BAE and General Dynamics were selected for evaluation. Concerns grew around the vehicle's proposed weight of around 70 tons. The GCV program was cancelled in 2014 due to sequestration budget cuts.

In June 2018, the Army established the Next Generation Combat Vehicle (NGCV) program to replace the M2 Bradley. In October 2018, the program was re-designated as the Optionally Manned Fighting Vehicle (OMFV). This program placed much of the cost burden of development on contractors, causing many competitors to drop out. In February 2020, the Army restarted the program, promising to take on more responsibility for funding.

Variants

M2 

The M2 was the basic production model, first fielded in 1981. The M2 can be identified by its standard TOW missile system, steel laminate armor, and  Cummins VT903 engine with HMPT-500 Hydro-mechanical transmission. Basic features included an integrated sight unit for the M242 25 mm gun, and thermal imaging system. The M2 was amphibious with the use of a "swim barrier" or "flotation screen" and was transportable by C-141 Starlifter and C-5 Galaxy aircraft. All M2 vehicles have been upgraded to improved standards. The M2 armor protects the vehicle through a full 360 degrees against 14.5 mm armor-piercing incendiary (API) ammunition.

The turret was offset to the right to maximize the room in the passenger compartment. Six infantry soldiers for dismounted fighting were held in the passenger compartment. Vision for the troops was provided through three periscopes placed between the rear ramp and the cargo hatch just behind the turret, as well as two periscopes on each side of the hull above the side firing ports. The passenger compartment held up to five TOW or Dragon missile reloads. The hull top, bottom, and front consisted of 5083 aluminum armor, and  steel armor was added to the front third of the hull bottom to increase mine protection.

M3

The M3 Bradley CFV is very similar to the M2 Bradley IFV (Infantry Fighting Vehicle) and is fielded with the same two-man 25mm Bushmaster Cannon turret with the coaxial 7.62mm machine gun. It only varies from the M2 in a few subtle ways and by role. The M3 is classified as an armored reconnaissance and scout vehicle and does away with the firing ports found in the M2 series. The M3 carries more TOW missiles as well as more ammunition for its 25mm and 7.62mm guns.

M2A1 
Introduced in 1986, the A1 variant included an improved TOW II missile system, a Gas Particulate Filter Units (GPFU) NBC system, and a fire-suppression system. In 1992, the M2A1s had begun being remanufactured to upgraded standards. The GPFU system was only connected to the vehicle commander, driver, and gunner, while the infantry squad had to use their own from MOPP suits. A seventh infantryman was added just behind the center of the turret.

M2A2 
Introduced in 1988, the A2 received an improved  engine with an HMPT-500-3 Hydromechanical transmission. Armor was improved, both passive and the ability to mount explosive reactive armor. The new armor protects the Bradley against 30 mm APDS rounds and RPGs, or similar anti-armor weapons. The new armor eliminated the trim vane that made the Bradley amphibious and covered up the side firing ports. Spaced laminate armor was installed to the hull rear. Spaced laminate track skirts protected the lower hull. 

A semicircular shield was attached to the turret rear to add more stowage space, as well as act as spaced armor. Kevlar spall liners were added to critical areas. The troop carrying number was reduced to six, eliminating the periscope position behind the driver. After live firing testing, the seating and stowage arrangements were redrawn. These upgrades raised the cumulative gross weight of the vehicle to 30,519 kg. The M2A2 was qualified to be transported by the C-17 Globemaster III. M2A2s were all eventually modified to the M2A2 ODS or M2A3 standard.

M2A2 ODS/ODS-E
The "Operation Desert Storm" and "Operation Desert Storm-Engineer" improvements were based on lessons learned during the first Gulf War in 1991. The major improvements included an eye-safe laser rangefinder (ELRF), a tactical navigation system (TACNAV) incorporating the Precision Lightweight GPS Receiver (PLGR) and the Digital Compass Systems (DCS), a missile countermeasure device designed to defeat first-generation wire-guided missiles, and the Force XXI Battle Command Brigade and Below (FBCB2) Battlefield Command Information System. 

The internal stowage was further improved and a thermal imaging system was added for the driver. The infantry squad was again increased to seven men, six of whom sat facing each other on two 3-man benches in the passenger compartment, with the seventh back in the position behind the turret. An MRE ('Meal, Ready-to-Eat') heater was added to the vehicle to assist in the preparation of food while in the field or warzone. With the retirement of the Dragon missile, the vehicle had the option of carrying some Javelin anti-tank missiles.

M2A3 

Introduced in 2000, the A3 upgrades make the Bradley IFV totally digital, with upgraded or improved existing electronics systems throughout, improving target acquisition and fire control, navigation, and situational awareness. The survivability of the vehicle was upgraded with a series of armor improvements, again both passive and reactive, as well as improved fire-suppression systems and NBC equipment.

The A3 Bradley incorporates the Improved Bradley Acquisition Subsystem (IBAS) and the Commander's Independent Viewer (CIV). Both include a second-generation forward looking infrared (FLIR) and an electro-optical/TV imaging system. The IBAS has direct-view optics (DVO) and the eye-safe laser rangefinder (ELRF). The CIV allows the commander to scan for targets and maintain situational awareness while remaining under armor, and without interfering with the gunner's acquisition and engagement of targets.

The A3's fire control software (FCSW) combines laser range, environmental readings, ammunition type, and turret control inputs to automatically elevate the gun for range and to automatically generate a kinematic lead solution if a target is moving. This functionality, very similar to that of the M1A2 Abrams, allows the gunner or commander to center the reticule on a moving target, lase the target, and achieve a first-round-hit, without the need to fire sensing rounds and adjust aim. The FCSW incorporates a thermal aided target tracker (ATT) function that can track two targets in the FLIR field of view and switch between them, primarily intended for employing TOW missiles against moving vehicles. The FCSW allows the turret and gunner's sights to be slewed automatically onto a target that has been designated with the CIV.

The A3 Bradley uses a position-navigation subsystem that incorporates a global positioning system (GPS), an inertial navigation unit (INU), and a vehicle motion sensor (MVS), which, in addition to allowing accurate own-vehicle navigation, allows accurate position reporting and the ability to hand-off designated targets to other units via FBCB2.

The Commander's Tactical Display (CTD) presents information from the FBCB2 and the vehicle navigation systems on a moving-map display. This allows the commander to communicate via text over FBCB2, and allows him to check vehicle built-in test (BIT) information and access various other information. The Squad Leader's Display (SLD) in the infantry compartment improves the situational awareness of the passengers by allowing them to view navigational information from the FBCB2 and imagery from the IBAS, CIV, or Driver's Vision Enhancer (DVE) to familiarize themselves with their surroundings prior to dismounting.

The M2A3 Bradley II, and an M2A3 Bradley variant used in Iraq, were included in the GCV Analysis of Alternatives.

M2A4 
After the Iraq War, the army began researching engineering change proposals (ECPs) for the M2 Bradley to restore space, weight, power, and cooling capacity reduced by the addition of armor and electronics hastily added during combat. ECP1 will work to restore mobility and allow the vehicle to handle more weight. As weight increased, the Bradley got lower on its suspension, which reduced ground clearance. This decreased mobility on rough terrain and left it more vulnerable to IEDs.

The effort will install lighter tracks, shock absorbers, a new suspension support system, and heavy weight torsion bars. ECP2 will restore automotive power with a larger engine, a new transmission, and a smart-power management system for better electrical power distribution to accept future networked tactical radio and battle command systems. The first Bradleys upgraded with ECP1 were fielded in mid-2015, and the first to be upgraded with ECP2 will begin fielding in 2018. Vehicles that receive both the ECP1 and ECP2 upgrade will be designated A4.

In June 2018, BAE Systems Land and Armaments was awarded a contract to produce up to 164 M2A4 and M7A4 Bradley Fighting Vehicles using existing M2A3, M7A3 and M2A2 ODS-SA Bradleys. The M2A4 is equipped with an enhanced drivetrain, a more powerful engine, new digitized electronics, a new fire suppression system, and a new IED jammer.

The first M2A4 models were fielded in April 2022.

Mission Enabler Technologies-Demonstrator 

The MET-D is an experimental variant of the M2 Bradley which prototypes the use of surrogate robotic combat vehicles (RCVs) that are operated by the crew of the MET-D. It is equipped with a remote turret for the main 25mm chain gun, 360-degree situational awareness cameras and enhanced crew stations with touchscreens.

Other uses of the Bradley chassis
The Bradley series has been widely modified. Its chassis is the basis for the M270 Multiple Launch Rocket System, the M4 C2V battlefield command post, and the M6 Bradley Linebacker air defense vehicle. Armed with a quad Stinger surface-to-air missile launcher in place of the TOW anti-tank missiles, but maintaining the 25 mm autocannon, the M6 Bradley Linebacker Air Defense Vehicle (no longer in service) possessed a unique role in the U.S. Army, providing highly mobile air defense at the front line.

The Bradley's suspension system has been used on upgraded versions of the U.S. Marines' Assault Amphibious Vehicle.

Table of variants

Operators

 : 32 M2A2
 : 400
 : 6,230

Future operators 
 : 89 units in M2A2 ODS variant costing $196.4 million
 : 109 M2A2 Bradleys committed by the United States

Potential operators



See also
 Armored Multi-Purpose Vehicle – Bradley-based APC
 BMP Development – contemporary Soviet project
 BTR-4- Ukrainian army wheeled IFV
 Ground Combat Vehicle – U.S. Army IFV canceled in 2014
 M1126 Infantry Carrier Vehicle – US Army Stryker infantry carrier vehicle
 M242 Bushmaster
 Mechanized infantry
 MICV-65 – US Army project leading to development of the M2 Bradley
 Warrior tracked armoured vehicle – contemporary British IFV
 The Pentagon Wars – film loosely based on Burton's account of the Bradley's development

References

Sources

External links 

 U.S. Army fact file on M2/M3 Bradley Fighting Vehicle
 M2 Bradley - Armoured Vehicles
 Bradley Fighting Vehicle Systems Upgrade to A3
 M2A3 and M3A3 Bradley Fighting Vehicle Systems (BFVS) at the FAS Military Analysis Network

Amphibious infantry fighting vehicles
Cold War armored fighting vehicles of the United States
Infantry fighting vehicles of the Cold War
Infantry fighting vehicles of the post–Cold War period
Infantry fighting vehicles of the United States
Tracked infantry fighting vehicles
Military vehicles introduced in the 1980s
United Defense